Al-Ghul is a sub-district located in Na'man District, Al Bayda Governorate, Yemen.  Al-Ghul had a population of 931  according to the 2004 census.

References 

Sub-districts in Na'man District